
Parqu Qucha (Quechua parquy irrigation, qucha lake, "irrigation lake", hispanicized spellings Parco Cocha, Parco Khocha, Parcococha, Parkho Khocha, Parko Q'ocha) is a Bolivian lake located in Vacas Municipality, Arani Province, Cochabamba Department.

The most important rivers which flow into Parqu Qucha are Challwa Mayu, Jatun Calada, Jatun Mayu, Kañara, Parqu Qucha, Pedregal River, Wasa K'uchu.

See also 
 Asiru Qucha
 Qullpa Qucha
 Pilawit'u

References

External links 
 Population data and map of Vacas Municipality

Lakes of Cochabamba Department